The Durango Herald is a newspaper in Durango, Colorado. The first edition of the Herald came out June 30, 1881. Two years later, the Herald merged with the Record, which had started publishing in 1880, seven months before the Herald. The modern Herald traces its roots to both papers but the current Herald nameplate cites 1881 as the paper's founding year. The paper was combined in 1952 after Arthur and Morley Cowles Ballantine purchased the Herald-Democrat and the News. In 1960, the name was changed to The Durango Herald.

Arthur was co-editor and co-publisher of the paper from 1952 until 1975. Morley was also co-editor and co-publisher and took over as chairman and editor after Arthur's death. She served as editor until her death in 2009. Her son Richard Ballantine took over the role of publisher in 1980. He retired in 2013, and Douglas Bennett was installed as CEO of Ballantine Communications, Inc., the Herald's parent company.
 
The Herald has won numerous awards, given by entities such as the Society of Professional Journalists, the Colorado Associated Press Reporters and Editors, and the Colorado Press Association. In 2002, the Herald received the Sigma Chi Award for Excellence in Journalism for public service.

References

External links
 Official website

Durango, Colorado
Newspapers published in Colorado